The Leancă Cabinet was the Cabinet of Moldova from 30 May 2013 to 18 February 2015. The Cabinet consisted of ministers from the Liberal Democratic Party (PLDM), the Democratic Party (PDM), and the Liberal Reformist Party (PLR), a splinter group from the Liberal Party (PL), who together formed the Pro-European Coalition. The Cabinet was installed after a successful vote of confidence held in the Parliament of Moldova on May 30, 2013.

Composition 

The Cabinet consisted of the Prime Minister of Moldova Iurie Leancă (first vice-president of the Liberal Democratic Party of Moldova; PLDM), three Deputy Prime Ministers, each representing one of the parties of the coalition, 15 ministers, and two ex officio members.

Cabinet of Ministers 
 Iurie Leancă (PLDM), Prime Minister of Moldova
 Tatiana Potîng, Deputy Prime Minister
 Natalia Gherman (PLDM), Deputy Minister, and Minister of Foreign Affairs and European Integration
 Veaceslav Negruţă (PLDM), Minister of Finance (since 31 May 2013)
 Anatol Arapu (PLDM), Minister of Finance (since 14 August 2013)
 Oleg Efrim (PLDM), Minister of Justice
 Dorin Recean (PLDM), Minister of Internal Affairs
 Vasile Bumacov, Minister of Agriculture and Food Industry 
 Maia Sandu (PLDM), Minister of Education
 Andrei Usatîi (PLDM), Minister of Health
 Valeriu Lazăr (PD), Minister of Economy (since 31 May 2013)
 Andrian Candu (PD), Minister of Economy (since 3 July 2013)
 Marcel Răducan (PD), Minister of Public Works and Regional Development
 Vasile Botnari (PD), Minister of Transport and Road Infrastructure
 Monica Babuc (PD), Minister of Culture
 Pavel Filip (PD), Minister of Information Technologies and Communication
 Valentina Buliga (PD), Minister of Labour, Social Protection and Family
 Gheorghe Șalaru (PLR), Minister of Environment (since 31 May 2013)
 Valentina Țapiș (PLR), Minister of Environment (since 6 June 2014)
 Vitalie Marinuța (PLR), Minister of Defence (since 31 May 2013)
 Valeriu Troenco (PLR), Minister of Defence (since 5 April 2014)
 Octavian Bodișteanu (PLD), Minister of Youth and Sports

References 

 

Moldova cabinets
Coalition governments
2013 establishments in Moldova
Cabinets established in 2013